The yellow-vented warbler (Phylloscopus cantator) is a species of leaf warbler (family Phylloscopidae). It was formerly included in the "Old World warbler" assemblage.

It is found in Bangladesh, Bhutan, China, India, Laos, Myanmar, Nepal, and Thailand. Its natural habitat is subtropical or tropical moist montane forests.

Description 
The yellow-vented warbler has a mass of 6-7 g and a size of about 11 cm (4.3 in).

References

yellow-vented warbler
Birds of Bhutan
Birds of Northeast India
Birds of Yunnan
Birds of Laos
yellow-vented warbler
Taxonomy articles created by Polbot